Yolalan is a town (belde) in the Bitlis District, Bitlis Province, Turkey. Its population is 3,091 (2021).

References

Towns in Turkey
Populated places in Bitlis Province
Bitlis District